Castra of Tirighina-Bărboși was a fort in the Roman province of Moesia. Here were found coins dating from the rule of Augustus (63 BC – 14 AD) through to Nero (37 AD – 68 AD).

See also
List of castra

Notes

External links

Roman legionary fortresses in Romania
History of Western Moldavia
Historic monuments in Galați County